"God Spede the Plough" (original: "God spede þe plouȝ: & sende us kǫꝛne Inolk") is the name of an early 16th-century manuscript poem which borrows twelve stanzas from Geoffrey Chaucer's Monk's Tale.

It is a short, satirical complaint, listing the various indolent members of the clergy who will demand a share of the ploughman's harvest, rendering his work futile.

The work contains a possible allusion to 1 Corinthians 9:10: "...when the plowman plows and the thresher threshes, they ought to do so in the hope of sharing the harvest." This verse is used by St Paul in an argument that the Apostles' ("we [who] have sown spiritual seed among you") food and other basic needs should be supplied by the laity of the early Christian church. The poem also deprecates taxation and issues the same sort of complaint as that found in the Second Shepherds' Play.

See also
Piers Plowman Tradition

References

External links
God Spede the Plough

Works based on The Canterbury Tales
Satirical books